Herserange (German: Herseringen, Luxembourgish: Hiirkeréng/Hierkeréng) is a commune in the Meurthe-et-Moselle department in north-eastern France. It is part of the urban area of Longwy.

See also
Communes of the Meurthe-et-Moselle department

References

Communes of Meurthe-et-Moselle